A noise trader is a stock trader whose decisions to buy or sell are based on "factors they believe to be helpful but in reality will give them no better returns than random choices". These factors may include hype or rumor, which noise traders believe to be reliable signals of future returns, but which are actually forms of economic noise that cannot be used to accurately predict the future value of a stock.

Noise traders do not trade randomly; their decisions are systematic. However, their trading decisions are not based on professional advice or a business's fundamentals, and the purported signals used by noise traders are more unreliable than those used by technical analysts. Therefore, returns on their trading decisions are expected to be no better than random choices.

Noise traders often act irrationally: they tend to be emotion-driven, impulsive, reactive, and herd-like. The presence of noise traders in financial markets can cause prices and risk levels to diverge from expected levels even if all other traders are rational.

See also
Noisy market hypothesis
Quantitative analyst
Behavioral economics

Notes

Financial markets